Robert Newdigate or Newdegate (died 1613) was an English courtier and landowner.

He was a son of John Newdigate of Harefield, Middlesex, and Anne Conquest (died 1619). He was a younger of brother of John Newdigate (died 1610), the husband of Anne Fitton.

He was a squire of the body to Elizabeth I. He was knighted by James VI and I in May 1603.

Newdigate was Member of Parliament for Grampound (1597) and Buckingham (1601).

In July 1605 Anne of Denmark stayed at his house at Hawnes or Haynes near Ampthill. She was entertained by a Scottish singing woman and Morris dancers, and gave them rewards of 40 shillings.

Robert Newdigate died on 5 September 1613. 

He married Elizabeth Stuteville, a daughter of Thomas Stuteville of Dalham, in 1590, their children included Robert and Joan.

References

Court of James VI and I
1613 deaths